Tennessee's 11th congressional district was a district of the United States Congress in Tennessee. It was lost to redistricting in 1853. Its last Representative was Christopher H. Williams.

List of representatives

References

 Congressional Biographical Directory of the United States 1774–present

Former congressional districts of the United States
11